Muhammad Sarwar Danish (born 1961) is an Afghan academic and politician in exile who was the second vice president of Afghanistan, from 2014 to 2021. He was previously the acting minister of justice from 2004 to 2010 and acting minister of higher education from 2010 to 2014. When Daykundi province was carved out of Urozgan province in 2004, Danish became its first governor.

Early years and education 
Danish, the son of Muhammad Ali, was born in 1961 in the Ishtarlay District of Daykundi province in central Afghanistan. He belongs to the Hazara ethnic group. As a Shia Muslim, he completed his higher education in the holy Iranian city of Qom, where he earned degrees in law, journalism and Islamic studies, receiving a master's degree in Fiqh. From 1982 until 2001, he wrote various publications, including 15 books and 700 academic essays. Along with Dari and Pashto, he also became fluent in the Arabic language.

Karzai administration 

After the Taliban regime was ousted and the Karzai administration was formed, Danish was involved in the 2002 loya jirga. He was a member of the Constitutional Drafting Commission through a decree by President Hamid Karzai and as a participant in the Constitutional Loya Jirga.  Following Karzai's election as president in 2004, Danish became Justice Minister and renounced his membership to Hezbe Wahdat as per Constitutional law.

Ghani administration
Under President Ashraf Ghani, Danish served as the second vice president in both terms, first with vice president Abdul Rashid Dostum and then Amrullah Salehfollowing the 2019 elections.  In 2021 after Kabul fell to the Taliban, Danish and associates escaped the country and eventually stayed in Turkey. In December 2021 he was resettled in New Zealand.

References

See also
Cabinet of Afghanistan
Afghan Ministry of Justice

People of the Islamic Republic of Afghanistan
Vice presidents of Afghanistan
1961 births
Living people
Higher education ministers of Afghanistan
Justice ministers of Afghanistan
Hazara politicians
People from Daykundi Province